Xie Huilin (born January 17, 1975) is a female Chinese football (soccer) player who competed in the 1996 Summer Olympics and in the 2000 Summer Olympics.

In 1996 she won the silver medal with the Chinese team. She played all five matches.

Four years later she was a member of the Chinese team which finished fifth in the women's tournament. She played two matches.

External links

profile

1975 births
Living people
Chinese women's footballers
Footballers at the 1996 Summer Olympics
Footballers at the 2000 Summer Olympics
Olympic footballers of China
Olympic silver medalists for China
1995 FIFA Women's World Cup players
Olympic medalists in football
Asian Games medalists in football
Footballers at the 1998 Asian Games
Medalists at the 1996 Summer Olympics
China women's international footballers
Asian Games gold medalists for China
Women's association football defenders
Medalists at the 1998 Asian Games
1999 FIFA Women's World Cup players